Marcel Berger (14 April 1927 – 15 October 2016) was a French mathematician, doyen of French differential geometry, and a former director of the Institut des Hautes Études Scientifiques (IHÉS), France.  Formerly residing in Le Castera in Lasseube, Berger was instrumental in Mikhail Gromov's accepting positions both at the University of Paris and at the IHÉS.

Awards and honors
1956 Prix Peccot, Collège de France
1962 Prix Maurice Audin
1969 Prix Carrière, Académie des Sciences
1978 Prix Leconte, Académie des Sciences
1979 Prix Gaston Julia
1979–1980 President of the French Mathematical Society.
1991 Lester R. Ford Award

Selected publications
 Berger, M.: Geometry revealed.  Springer, 2010.
 Berger, M.: What is... a Systole? Notices of the AMS 55 (2008), no. 3, 374–376. online text
 

Berger, Marcel; Gauduchon, Paul; Mazet, Edmond: Le spectre d'une variété riemannienne. (French) Lecture Notes in Mathematics, Vol. 194 Springer-Verlag, Berlin-New York 1971.
Berger, Marcel: Sur les groupes d'holonomie homogène des variétés à connexion affine et des variétés riemanniennes. (French) Bull. Soc. Math. France 83 (1955), 279–330.
Berger, Marcel: Les espaces symétriques noncompacts. (French) Ann. Sci. École Norm. Sup. (3) 74 1957 85–177.
Berger, Marcel; Gostiaux, Bernard: Differential geometry: manifolds, curves, and surfaces. Translated from the French by Silvio Levy. Graduate Texts in Mathematics, 115. Springer-Verlag, New York, 1988. xii+474 pp. 
Berger, Marcel: Geometry. II. Translated from the French by M. Cole and S. Levy. Universitext. Springer-Verlag, Berlin, 1987.
Berger, M.: Les variétés riemanniennes homogènes normales simplement connexes à courbure strictement positive. (French) Ann. Scuola Norm. Sup. Pisa (3) 15 1961 179–246.
Berger, Marcel: Geometry. I. Translated from the French by M. Cole and S. Levy. Universitext. Springer-Verlag, Berlin, 1987. xiv+428 pp. 
Berger, Marcel: Systoles et applications selon Gromov. (French) [Systoles and their applications according to Gromov] Séminaire Bourbaki, Vol. 1992/93. Astérisque No. 216 (1993), Exp. No. 771, 5, 279–310.
Berger, Marcel: Geometry. I. Translated from the 1977 French original by M. Cole and S. Levy. Corrected reprint of the 1987 translation. Universitext. Springer-Verlag, Berlin, 1994. xiv+427 pp. 
Berger, Marcel: Riemannian geometry during the second half of the twentieth century. Reprint of the 1998 original. University Lecture Series, 17. American Mathematical Society, Providence, Rhode Island, 2000. x+182 pp. 
Besse, A.L.: Einstein Manifolds. Springer-Verlag, Berlin, 1987.

See also
 Arthur Besse
 Berger's inequality for Einstein manifolds
 Berger–Kazdan comparison theorem
 Musical isomorphism
 Parametrix
 Quaternion-Kähler manifold
 Spin(7)-manifold
 Symmetric space
 Systolic geometry

References

Further reading
 Claude LeBrun (Editor and Translator). "Marcel Berger Remembered", Notices of the American Mathematical Society, December 2017, Volume 64, Number 11, pp. 1285–1295.

External links

https://web.archive.org/web/20141021192249/http://www.academie-sciences.fr/academie/membre/Berger_Marcel.htm

1927 births
2016 deaths
Members of the French Academy of Sciences
20th-century French mathematicians
21st-century French mathematicians
Geometers
Differential geometers
Textbook writers